Fiona Claire Bruce (née Riley; born 26 March 1957) is a British Conservative Party politician who was elected the Member of Parliament (MP) for Congleton in the 2010 general election.

Early life
Fiona Claire Riley was born on 26 March 1957 in Wick, Caithness, Scotland to Allan Stewart and Greta Riley (née Scott). She attended Burnley High School for Girls, and the private Howell's School, Llandaff in Cardiff. Riley then studied law at the Victoria University of Manchester and further studies at Chester Law College.

She was admitted as a solicitor in 1981, and has been senior partner of the firm, Fiona Bruce & Co in Warrington, since its formation in 1988.

Political career
Bruce was elected in 2004 to Warrington Borough Council, on which she served as Executive Member for Finance from 2006 to 2009. She stepped down from the Council upon her election to Parliament in 2010. Bruce had previously unsuccessfully contested Warrington South in the 2005 general election, finishing second to sitting Labour MP Helen Southworth. In 2006 Bruce was placed on the Conservative A-List of priority parliamentary candidates following efforts by the Conservative Women2Win mentoring and pressure group.

Following her selection as the Conservative Party candidate for the Congleton constituency, Bruce denied allegations that she had been chosen following an orchestrated campaign by religious groups sympathetic to her evangelical Christian beliefs. Bruce is an Evangelical Alliance council member and describes "defending and fighting for the sanctity of human life" as her priority in Parliament. She has been a member of the Scottish Affairs Select Committee since 2010.

In February 2015, Bruce introduced an amendment to the Serious Crime Bill 2014 to make abortion on the grounds of the sex of the baby illegal. The amendment was rejected by 292 votes to 201.

Bruce supported Brexit in the 2016 referendum.

In 2019, Bruce chaired an inquiry by the Conservative Party Human Rights Commission into prostitution, which made the recommendation to replace existing laws on soliciting prostitution with laws that would make paying for sexual services a criminal offence.

In 2020, she was appointed by Boris Johnson as the Prime Minister's Special Envoy for Freedom of Religion or Belief, and in this capacity she has been supportive of a petition to grant asylum to Maira Shahbaz and her family, a Pakistani Christian girl who has received death threats.

In May 2021 Bruce co-authored an essay entitled "Family Matters – the Case for Strengthening Families" with former MP, David Burrowes, for inclusion in Common Sense: Conservative Thinking for a Post-Liberal Age published by the Common Sense Group, an informal group of Conservative MPs.

In January 2023, Sky News revealed that Bruce had, since the 2019 general election, earnt more than £700,000 in addition to her salary as an MP – the fourth-highest amount of any MP.

Personal life 
She married Richard John Bruce in 1990, and they have two sons. Fiona Bruce was awarded the title of "Small Businesswoman of the Year" in 2003.

References

External links
Fiona Bruce MP  Conservative Party profile
Congleton Conservatives

1957 births
Living people
People from Wick, Caithness
People from Congleton
Scottish evangelicals
People educated at Howell's School Llandaff
Alumni of the Victoria University of Manchester
Female members of the Parliament of the United Kingdom for English constituencies
Conservative Party (UK) MPs for English constituencies
UK MPs 2010–2015
UK MPs 2015–2017
UK MPs 2017–2019
UK MPs 2019–present
21st-century British women politicians
21st-century English women
21st-century English people